Avilora is a village located in  Kozhikode district of Kerala state, south India.

Transportation
Avilora village connects to other parts of India through koduvally city.  National highway No.212 passes through Koduvally . The nearest airports are at Kannur and Kozhikode.  The nearest railway stations are koyilandy and kozhikode.

References 

Vatakara area